Rajpur Rural Municipality is a municipal unit in Dang district in western Nepal. It was formed by a combination of the erstwhile Bela and Rajpur Village Development Committees.
The center of the Rural Municipality is located at Gangdi.

Geography

Rajpur borders India to the south and to Banke District on the west. The Rapti river forms the northern border of the municipality while there is Gadhawa Rural Municipality of Dang district on the east. 
Three distinct regions are present. The northern river plains region is called the Deukhuri region, the middle hills region is called the Khola region while the southern hills and plateaus form the Naka region.

Administrative Divisions

Rajpur Rural Municipality is divided into seven wards.

Demographics

The population of Rajpur is about 30,000. The main residents in Rajpur are Tharus, Yadavs, Chhetris, Magars, Bahuns, Dalits, and Muslims.
The Deukhuri region is populated mostly by Tharus and Yadavs while the Magars live mostly in the hilly regions in the south.

Rural municipalities in Dang District, Nepal
Rural municipalities of Nepal established in 2017